

The Bücker Bü 134 was a German single engine, high wing cabin monoplane prototype designed and built by Bücker Flugzeugbau GmbH.

History
Two of the designs made by Bücker's Swedish engineer Anders J. Anderson, the Bücker Bü 134, of which only one was built, and a later development, the Bücker Bü 180 Student, could have been the result of the Volksflugzeug proposal made by the LC II, the department of the Technisches Amt of the Nazi Ministry of Aviation responsible for the development of new aircraft, even though the Bü 134 was powered by a Hirth HM 504 A motor which with 105 HP fell a bit beyond the scheme.

Development
In 1936 the Bücker Flugzeugbau company developed their first monoplane design. The Bü 134 was intended as a light general aviation aircraft featuring side by side seating. The wings were foldable for convenient hangarage. Flight testing was not successful and the type was not put into series production. The single prototype aircraft, D-EQPA, was destroyed in a hangar fire on 21 May 1939.

Specifications (Bü 134)

See also

References

External links

1930s German sport aircraft
Bücker aircraft
High-wing aircraft
Aircraft first flown in 1936